The Wells-Keith House is the only single-story brick double house in Augusta.  Both units have hall-parlor plans.  The west unit may have been built first, based on chimney placement.  The west gable features an end chimney while there is an absence of a chimney on the east gable.  Stylistic details include common bond masonry, small two-over-two sash and sandstone lintels and sills.

Theodore Hamilton, former mayor of Augusta, conveyed lots 4 and 5 in Square 19 to Lewis B. Wells In 1858.  Wells paid $575 for the property and sold it to Anderson D. Keith for $900 in 1864.  Keith, a native of Virginia, was listed in the 1850 census as one of four Augusta physicians.  The "house and lot" were deeded to Ann G. Keith in 1871.

References

National Register of Historic Places in Bracken County, Kentucky
Houses on the National Register of Historic Places in Kentucky
Houses in Bracken County, Kentucky
1864 establishments in Kentucky
Houses completed in 1864
Hall and parlor houses
Augusta, Kentucky